So It Continues is the second album by S.O. released on November 13, 2012, on Lamp Mode Recordings.

Reception

Specifying in a three and a half star out of five review by New Release Tuesday, Mark Ryan realizes, "With the exception of a couple musical miscues in outros, and one song that didn’t really fit in, this album was well done from beginning to end." In a ten out of ten review by Steve Hayes from Cross Rhythms, recognizes, "Drink deeply, reflect on and allow this to sink deep into your heart." K Hill, indicating in a four star out of five review for Jam the Hype, responds, "It truly is a project that has more in mind than simply pulling heart strings, the aim is undoubtedly to tune them to the key of The King."

Track listing

Charts

References

2012 albums
S.O. (rapper) albums